There are over 300,000 Catholics living in Iraq, just 0.95% of the total population.  The Catholics of Iraq follow several different rites, but most are members of the Chaldean Catholic Church. There are 17 currently active dioceses and eparchies in Iraq.

In 2019, the Archbishop of Erbil, in Kuridstan, warned that Catholicism and Christianity in general was in danger of becoming 'extinct' in Iraq due to persistent persecution from militant Islamic groups such as Daesh.

Dioceses and Eparchies
 Armenian Catholic Archeparchy of Baghdad
 Chaldean Catholic Archeparchy of Basra
 Chaldean Catholic Archeparchy of Erbil
 Chaldean Catholic Archeparchy of Kirkuk-Sulaimaniya
 Chaldean Catholic Archeparchy of Mosul
 Chaldean Catholic Diocese of Alquoch
 Chaldean Catholic Diocese of Aqrā
 Chaldean Catholic Eparchy of Amadiyah and Zaku
 Chaldean Catholic Archeparchy of Baghdad
 Chaldean Catholic Patriarchal See of Babylon
 Melkite Greek Catholic Patriarchal Exarchate of Iraq
 Roman Catholic Archdiocese of Baghdad
 Syriac Catholic Archeparchy of Baghdad
 Syriac Catholic Archeparchy of Mosul
 Syriac Catholic Patriarchal Exarchate of Basra and the Gulf

See also
Catholic Church by country

References

External links
 GCatholic.org
 Catholic-Hierarchy

 
Iraq
Iraq